Bobby Joe Champion (born December 17, 1963) is an American attorney and politician serving as a member of the Minnesota Senate. A member of the Minnesota Democratic–Farmer–Labor Party (DFL), he represents the 59th district, which includes portions of downtown and north Minneapolis in Hennepin County. He is the incumbent President of the Minnesota Senate.

Early life and education
Champion was born in Minneapolis and graduated from Minneapolis North High School. He earned a Bachelor of Arts degree in political science from Macalester College and a Juris Doctor from the William Mitchell College of Law.

Career 
Champion worked as an assistant Minnesota attorney general under Skip Humphrey and Mike Hatch, and as an attorney for a legal rights center. He also worked with Flyte Tyme Productions and was co-founder and director of the Grammy-nominated Excelsior Choir. He was executive director of the Midwest chapter of the National Association of Minority Contractors and program director for Social Spaces with Stairstep Initiative.

Minnesota House of Representatives 
Champion was elected to the House in 2008, unseating first-term incumbent Augustine Dominguez. He was reelected in 2010.

Minnesota Senate 
In November 2012, Champion was elected to the Minnesota Senate, defeating Republican Jim Lilly by a margin of 82%–18%. Champion was reelected to the Minnesota Senate in 2016, defeating challenger Jennifer Carnahan. Champion was also re-elected in 2020 and 2022. In 2022, he was chosen to serve as president of the Senate by his caucus; he is expected to be formally elected when the Senate meets in January 2023.

References

External links 

 Senator Bobby Joe Champion official Minnesota Senate website
 Project Votesmart - Rep. Bobby Joe Champion Profile

1963 births
20th-century African-American people
21st-century African-American politicians
21st-century American politicians
African-American state legislators in Minnesota
Democratic Party members of the Minnesota House of Representatives
Democratic Party Minnesota state senators
Lawyers from Minneapolis
Living people
Macalester College alumni
Politicians from Minneapolis
William Mitchell College of Law alumni